Lost Echo Lake is a lake in the east-central part of the Canadian province of Saskatchewan in Narrow Hills Provincial Park. It is situated in a glacier-formed valley in the Cub Hills and the boreal forest ecozone of Canada. It is located south of Summit Lake and is accessed from secondary roads that branch off of Highway 913. While there are no communities or settlements on the lake, there is the Lost Echo Wilderness Campsite on the western shore.

Description 
Lost Echo Lake is situated along the course of Caribou Creek in a valley in the Cub Hills, south of Summit Lake and north of Upper Fishing Lake. From Lost Echo Lake, Caribou Creek carries on down the valley, passing through the lakes of Lower Echo Lake and Upper Fishing Lake and into Lower Fishing Lake. Lower Fishing lake is drained by Stewart Creek, which flows south into Torch River. Torch River flows east into the Saskatchewan River and is part of the Hudson Bay drainage basin. Inflows into the lake include waters flowing in from Summit Lake via Caribou Creek, and nearby hills and muskeg.

Fish species 
Fish commonly found in Lost Echo Lake include walleye, northern pike, and lake trout. The lake's outflow, also known as Lost Echo Creek, was first stocked with brook trout in 1934. The creek is well suited for brook trout and as a result, the trout developed a sustainable, naturalised population.

See also 
List of lakes of Saskatchewan
List of protected areas of Saskatchewan
Tourism in Saskatchewan
Hudson Bay drainage basin

References 

Lakes of Saskatchewan
Northern Saskatchewan Administration District